The following is a list of universities in Kazakhstan by cities:

Aktau

Aktau College of Foreign Languages
Sh. Yesenov - Caspian State University of Technology and Engineering

Aktobe

Aktobe State Pedagogical Institute
K. Zhubanov Aktobe State University
Kazakh-Russian International University
M. Ospanov West Kazakhstan State Medical Academy

Almaty

Abai Kazakh National Pedagogical University
Adilet Law Academy 
Al-Farabi Kazakh National University 
Almaty Management University 
Almaty Technological University 
Almaty University of Power Engineering and Telecommunications
Kazakh National Medical University
Central Asian University
German-Kazakh University
International Information Technology University 
Kazakh Russian Medical University
Kainar University
Kazakh Ablai Khan University of International Relations and World Languages
Kazakh Academy of Labour and Social Relations 
Kazakh Academy of Sports & Tourism 
Kazakh-American University
Kazakh Automobile Road Institute 
Kazakh-British Technical University 
Kazakh Leading Academy of Architecture and Civil Engineering 
Kazakh National Agrarian University
KIMEP University
University of Foreign Languages and Business Career
Kazakh National Conservatory
M. Tynyshbayev Kazakh Academy of Transport & Communication
Narxoz University
Satbayev Kazakh National Technical University
Suleyman Demirel University 
Kazakh National Academy of Arts
 Turan University
University of Central Asia in Tekeli
University of International Business

Atyrau

 Atyrau University
Atyrau Institute of Oil and Gas

Ekibastuz

K.I.Satpayev Ekisbastuz Engineering & Technical Institute

Karaganda

Karagandy State University
Karaganda State Medical University
Karagandy State Medical Academy
Karagandy State Technical University
Central Kazakhstan Academy
Karaganda Economic University

Kokshetau

Sh. Ualikhanov Kokshetau State University

Kostanay

A. Baitursynov Kostanay State University 
Kostanay State Pedagogical Institute

Kyzylorda

Korkyt Ata Kyzylorda State University

Astana

JSC Astana Medical University
Akmola State Medical Academy
Kazakh National Academy of Music 
L.N.Gumilyov Eurasian National University 
Nazarbayev University 
S. Seifullin Kazakh Agrotechnical University
JSC "Financial Academy"
"Shabyt" Kazakh National University of the Arts
 Kazakh University of Economics, Finance and International Trade
 Astana IT University (AITU)

Oral

West Kazakhstan State University
West Kazakhstan Humanitarian Academy
Zhangir-Khan West Kazakhstan Agricultural & Technical University

Oskemen

D. Serikbaev East Kazakhstan State Technical University
East Kazakhstan Regional University
Kazakh-American Free University
Sarsen Amanzholov East Kazakhstan State University

Pavlodar

Innovative University of Eurasia
Pavlodar State Pedagogical Institute 
Pavlodar State University S. Toraigyrov

Petropavl

 North Kazakhstan State University

Rudni

Rudniy Industrial Institute

Semey

Kazakh Finance Economical Institute
Semey State Medical Academy
Semey State Pedagogical Institute
Shakerim Semey State University

Shymkent

Kazakhstan University of People's Friendship
Auezov South Kazakhstan State University
M. Saparbayev South Kazakhstan Humanitarian Institute
South Kazakhstan State Medical Academy
Shymkent University

Taraz

Taraz State Pedagogical Institute
Taraz State University M.H.Dulati 
Jambyl Hydromelioration and Construction Institute
Jambyl of Humanities and Technique

Tekeli

University of Central Asia

Turkistan

Ahmet Yesevi Üniversitesi

Zhezkazgan

O.A. Baikonurov Zhezkazgan University

 *
Universities
Kazakhstan
Kazakhstan
Kazakhstan